The  was an overnight express train service in Japan operated by Hokkaido Railway Company (JR Hokkaido), which ran from  to  via the Tsugaru Line, Kaikyō Line, Esashi Line, Hakodate Main Line, Muroran Main Line, and Chitose Line. The journey took approximately seven and a half hours. Following the withdrawal of the Ginga overnight express service between Tokyo and Osaka in 2008, the Hamanasu became the only locomotive-hauled express service in Japan. The service was discontinued in March 2016.

Rolling stock
The train was formed of 14 and 24 series seating cars and sleeping cars based at JR Hokkaido's Sapporo Depot, typically consisting of 7 cars. The train was hauled by a JR Hokkaido Hakodate-based Class ED79 AC electric locomotive between Aomori and Hakodate, and by a Hakodate-based Class DD51 diesel locomotive between Hakodate and Sapporo.

The typical formation in 2010 was as follows.
 SuHaNeFu 14-550 (Sleeping car with generator)
 OHaNe 24-500 (Sleeping car)
 SuHaFu 14-550 (Non-reserved seating car with generator)
 OHa 14-500 (Reserved "Nobinobi Carpet" sleeping car)
 OHa 14-500 (Reserved "Dream car" seating car)
 OHa 14-500 (Reserved "Dream car" seating car)
 SuHaFu 14-500 (Non-reserved seating car with generator)

The "Dream cars" used reclining seats from former Green cars.

Interior

Sleeping car accommodation

Seating car accommodation

History
The Hamanasu was introduced on 1 June 1955 as a semi-express operating between Hakodate and Abashiri via Sapporo. From 1 October 1961, this was upgraded to Express status as a service operating between Sapporo and Abashiri. This operated until 30 September 1968, when the services were integrated with the  express services.

The Hamanasu name was revived from 13 March 1988 for use on overnight express services between Aomori and Sapporo following the opening of the Seikan Tunnel. Initially, the train consisted of five 14 series seating cars only (with two designated as reserved seating cars), but from July 1991, two sleeping cars were included in the formation. From March 1997, a "Nobinobi Carpet" sleeping car was also added.

Withdrawal
The last Hamanasu services were discontinued in March 2016 ahead of the opening of the Hokkaido Shinkansen high-speed line. The last up service departed from Sapporo Station on 20 March 2016, and the last down service departed from Aomori on 21 March, arriving at Sapporo on 22 March.

Reasons cited by JR Hokkaido for discontinuing the service included (1) the locomotives used to haul the train through the Seikan Tunnel not being able to operate through the tunnel after March 2016, (2) the lack of funds to purchase new locomotives, (3) the difficulties in securing paths through the tunnel at night due to inspections of the shinkansen infrastructure, and (4) aging rolling stock dating from 40 years ago.

New JR Hokkaido Hamanasu Tourist Train 
JR Hokkaido has revived the Hamanasu name giving it to one of two multi-use Series 5000 tourist trains. These trains, remodelled Series 261 DMU's, are expected to replace the Crystal Express and the North Rainbow Express.

See also
 Blue Train (Japan)

References

External links

 JR Hokkaido train guide 

Hokkaido Railway Company
Named passenger trains of Japan
Night trains of Japan
Railway services introduced in 1955
1955 establishments in Japan
Railway services discontinued in 2016
2016 disestablishments in Japan